Windows Embedded Compact 7 (formerly known as Windows Embedded CE 7.0) is the seventh major release of the Windows Embedded CE operating system, released on March 1, 2011. Windows Embedded Compact 7 is a real-time OS, separate from the Windows NT line, and is designed to target enterprise specific tools such as industrial controllers and consumer electronics devices such as digital cameras, GPS systems and also automotive infotainment systems. Windows Embedded Compact is designed to run on multiple CPU architectures and supports x86, SH (automotive only) and ARM.

During development, a Microsoft employee working in this division claimed that Microsoft was working hard on this release and that it shares the underlying kernel with Windows Phone. Microsoft officially confirmed this and said that Windows Phone 7 is based on Windows Embedded CE 6.0 R3 with some features borrowed from Windows Embedded Compact 7, thus making it a hybrid solution.

New features
Windows Embedded Compact 7 contains these features:
Silverlight for Windows Embedded: Allows developers to develop application and user interfaces in Silverlight using Microsoft Expression Blend
Internet Explorer for Windows Embedded: A web browser similar to that of Windows Phone 7 with integrated Adobe Flash v10.1 support
Touch support: Windows Embedded Compact 7 recognizes touch and gesture input types
CPU support: Works on dual core CPUs in symmetric multiprocessing mode
Platform support: Runs on x86, SH4 (automotive only) MIPS and ARMv7 platforms
Media playback: Supports Digital Living Network Alliance (DLNA) and Media Transfer Protocol (MTP)
Networking: Now includes NDIS 6.1 and supports Bluetooth 2.1 EDR

References

Windows CE
Real-time operating systems